The Object 277 (Объект 277) was a prototype Soviet heavy tank designed in 1957, one of the last heavy tanks to be produced by the USSR. Developed alongside its sister design, the Object 278, as well as the Object 279 and the Object 770, Object 277 was a conventional heavy tank, armed with a powerful gun and thickly armoured. All development was cancelled in 1960, as part of Nikita Khrushchev's wish to abandon what he deemed obsolete heavy tanks, and re-focus efforts on ATGMs.

History 
In 1956, the GBTU (main armour directorate of the USSR) laid out the tactical and technical requirements for a new heavy tank. 3 projects would eventually emerge from this decree: the Object 277, 279 and 770. Object 277 and 279 were developed at OKBT (LKZ), the Leningrad Special-purpose Design Bureau (SKB), and Object 770 at Chelyabinsk Tractor Plant. Despite having wildly different designs, the 3 vehicles were to share the 130mm M-65. Object 279's development was headed by L.S. Troyanov, Object 770's by Pavel Isakov, and Object 277's by Josef Kotin.

Development 
Development of the Object 277 began in 1956. From the beginning, there were to be two vehicles: Object 277 and Object 278, different in design. However, the two design groups led by N.F. Shashmurin and N.M. Chistyakov decided to unify the layout of their designs, instead varying only in the engine. In December 1958, the first prototype of the Object 277 was manufactured, and sent to testing. The second prototype was also produced during this time, and both were tested from January 7, 1959 until February 26, 1960. A separate turret and hull were also produced for firing tests.
 
Testing revealed the Object 277 was inferior to the Object 770. Subsequently, work on the 277 was cancelled following the Decree of the Council of Ministers of the USSR on July 19, 1960. 3 days later, on July 22, 1960, Khrushchev forbade the further development of any tanks with a weight of over 37 tons. This halted the development of all 3 of the vehicles, and with a new focus on MBTs and ATGMs, consigned heavy tanks to history.

Design 

The Object 277 was a standard heavy tank design. The hull was based on the T-10M, but elongated and more curved. The 277 carried the 130mm M-65 cannon. The gun was stabilised with the "Groza" system and was attached to a TPDS stereoscopic rangefinder sight. The gun was loaded with the help of an assisted loading mechanism, as the shells were too heavy to be safely and quickly loaded solely by manpower (30.7 kg). The 30.7 kg armour-piercing ammunition could be fired at 1050 m/s, and penetrated 280mm of vertical steel at 1000m. APDS ammunition (8.7 kg in weight) could be fired at 1800 m/s, and penetrated 350mm of vertical steel at 1000m. The cannon could elevate and depress to +16° and -5° respectively.

The Object 277 had impressive armour characteristics: the cast turret varied from 290mm to 139mm, at angles from 30° to 55° from the vertical. The hull was around 140mm thick, and the sloped sides around 112mm. During testing, the armour withstood close-range shots from the 122mm D-25T. The vehicle was also equipped with an anti-nuclear protection system and thermal smoke equipment.

The engine used was the M-850 diesel engine, an upgraded version of the B-2 diesel engine, producing a horsepower of 1090. Despite the tank's weight of 55 tons, the engine and transmission could propel the vehicle to a maximum speed of 55 km/h.

Variants 

During development, a separate vehicle was designed with a new engine in mind. The Object 278 was in all other ways identical to the Object 277, but housed the experimental GTD-1 gas turbine engine, as well as a planetary gearbox. The vehicle never left the blueprint stage, and development was cancelled on July 19, 1960, along with the Object 277.

References 

Cold War tanks of the Soviet Union
Heavy tanks of the Soviet Union
Trial and research tanks of the Soviet Union
Abandoned military projects of the Soviet Union
Kirov Plant products